Scout X-1A was an American  sounding rocket which was flown in 1962. It was a five-stage derivative of the earlier Scout X-1, with an uprated first stage, and a NOTS-17 upper stage.

The Scout X-1A used an Algol 1C first stage, instead of the earlier Algol 1B used on the Scout X-1. The second, third and fourth stages were the same as those used on the Scout X-1; a Castor 1A, Antares 1A and Altair 1A respectively. The fifth stage was the NOTS-17 solid rocket motor, which had been developed by the Naval Ordnance Test Station.

The Scout X-1A was launched on its only flight at 05:07 GMT on 1 March 1962. It flew from Launch Area 3 of the Wallops Flight Facility. Following this, the Scout X-1A was replaced by the Scout X-2.

References

 

1962 in spaceflight
X-1A